Euptera ituriensis is a butterfly in the family Nymphalidae. It is found in the north-eastern part of the Democratic Republic of the Congo.

References

Butterflies described in 1998
Euptera
Endemic fauna of the Democratic Republic of the Congo